General elections were held in Nicaragua on February 5, 1967 to elect a president and National Congress.

"Fernando Agüero led the Conservative presidential slate again in the 1967 presidential contest and was the sole nominee of the National Opposition Union (Unión Nacional Opositora – UNO) coalition. The Conservatives (then at the apogee of their popular support) and their Social Christian and Independent Liberal allies mobilized widespread popular opposition to the first presidential candidacy of National Guard head Anastasio Somoza Debayle. Although UNO lost the presidency to the Liberals the PPSC did win one seat each in the House and Senate".

"In retrospect, the election of 1967 was the zenith of the Somozan political and electoral apparatus. From that time on, the younger Somoza took personal charge of everything, excluded the principal power groups of the Liberal Party, and started a gradual decline in the electoral efforts which eventually lost all pretense at being democratic at the domestic level".

Results

References

Bibliography
 Booth, John A. The end and the beginning: the Nicaraguan revolution. Boulder: Westview Press. Second edition, revised and updated. 1985.
 Bowdler, George A. and Patrick Cotter. Voter participation in Central America, 1954-1981: an exploration. Washington, D.C.: University Press of America. 1982.
 Elections in the Americas A Data Handbook Volume 1. North America, Central America, and the Caribbean. Edited by Dieter Nohlen. 2005.
 Gambone, Michael D. Capturing the revolution: the United States, Central America, and Nicaragua, 1961-1972. Westport: Praeger. 2001.
 Leonard, Thomas M. “The quest for Central American democracy since 1945.” Assessing democracy in Latin America. 1998. Boulder: Westview Press.
 Millett, Richard. Guardians of the dynasty: a history of the U.S. created Guardia Nacional de Nicaragua and the Somoza Family. Maryknoll: Orbis Books. 1977.
 Political handbook of the world 1968. New York, 1969.
 Smith, Hazel. Nicaragua: self-determination and survival. London : Pluto Press. 1993.
 Walker, Thomas W. The Christian Democratic movement in Nicaragua. Tucson: University of Arizona Press. 1970.

Elections in Nicaragua
Nicaragua
1967 in Nicaragua
Presidential elections in Nicaragua
Election and referendum articles with incomplete results